Fitton End is a hamlet in the civil parish of Newton-in-the-Isle, in the Fenland district, in the county of Cambridgeshire, England. It has a population of 70.

References

Hamlets in Cambridgeshire
Fenland District